Gaspar Necas Fortunato (born 23 September 1999), commonly known as Tshabalala, is an Angolan footballer who currently plays as a forward for Aliados Futebol Clube de Lordelo.

Career statistics

Club

Notes

International

References

1999 births
Living people
Angolan footballers
Angolan expatriate footballers
Angola international footballers
Association football forwards
Girabola players
Campeonato de Portugal (league) players
Académica Petróleos do Lobito players
Progresso Associação do Sambizanga players
S.C. Freamunde players
S.C. Salgueiros players
People from Luanda
Angolan expatriate sportspeople in Portugal
Expatriate footballers in Portugal